

English language

General 
The great historical, geographical, genealogical and poetical dictionary by Jeremy Collier (1701)
An Universal, Historical, Geographical, Chronological and Poetical Dictionary (1703)
Lexicon Technicum by John Harris (1704)
Cyclopaedia, or an Universal Dictionary of Arts and Sciences by Ephraim Chambers (1728)
General Dictionary, Historical and Critical by Thomas Birch (1734-41)
Dictionarium polygraphicum by John Barrow (1735)
An Universal History of Arts and Sciences by Dennis de Coetlogon (1745)
A new universal history of arts and sciences (1759)
A new and complete dictionary of arts and sciences (1763)
Complete Dictionary of the Arts and Sciences by Thomas Henry Croker (1764–1766)
The new complete dictionary of arts and sciences, or, An universal system of useful knowledge Vol. 2 (1778)
New Royal Cyclopaedia and Encyclopaedia (1788). Edited by George Selby Howard and published in London in 1788, this was largely a plagiarization of Ephraim Chambers's Cyclopaedia.
Encyclopædia Perthensis (1796–1806, ed 2 by 1816)

Britannica 
Encyclopædia Britannica First Edition (1768–1771)
Encyclopædia Britannica Second Edition (1777–1784) 
Encyclopædia Britannica Third Edition (1797) 
Dobson's Encyclopædia (1789–1798; largely a reprint of the Britannica's 3rd edition)
Moore's Dublin Edition (1788–1797; largely a reprint of the Britannica's 3rd edition)

Specialized 
The Complete Farmer: Or, a General Dictionary of Husbandry
Medicinal Dictionary by Robert James (1743–1745), 
The universal dictionary of trade and commerce by Malachy Postlethwayt (an adaptation of Dictionnaire universel de commerce. by Jacques Savary des Brûlons (1751)
Urania or, A compleat view of the heavens: containing the antient and modern astronomy, in form of a dictionary by  John Hill (1754)
Chemical Dictionary by William Nicholson (1795)
 A mathematical and philosophical dictionary by Charles Hutton (1795)

Chinese encyclopedias
Gujin Tushu Jicheng (1725–26), Qing dynasty
Siku Quanshu (1782), Qing dynasty

French encyclopedias
Dictionnaire de Trévoux (1704–1771)
La Science des personnes de cour, d'épée et de robe by Chevigny (1707)
Nouveau dictionnaire historique et critique by Jacques-Georges Chauffepié (1750)
Dictionaire historique by Prosper Marchand (1758)
Encyclopédie, by Diderot and D'Alembert (1751–1772)
Descriptions des Arts et Métiers (1761–1788)
Encyclopédie ou dictionnaire universel raisonné des connaissances humaines, Yverdon, (1770–1780)
Encyclopédie Méthodique by Charles-Joseph Panckoucke (1782–1832)

Specialized 
Dictionnaire philosophique, Voltaire

German encyclopedias
Reales Staats- und Zeitungs-Lexicon by Philipp Balthasar Sinold von Schütz (1704)
Curieuses Natur- Kunst- Gewerk- und Handlungs-Lexicon by Paul Jacob Marperger (1712)
Allgemeines lexikon der Künste und Wißenschaften by Johann Theodor Jablonski (1721)
Musicalisches Lexicon by Johann Gottfried Walther (1732)
Allgemeines Gelehrten-Lexicon by Christian Gottlieb Jöcher (1733–1751)
Grosses vollständiges Universal-Lexicon by Johann Heinrich Zedler (1751–1754)
Oekonomische Encyklopädie by Johann Georg Krünitz (1773–1858)
Deutschen Encyclopädie (1788)
Historisch-biographisches Lexikon der Tonküstler by Ernst Ludwig Gerber (1790–1792)
Conversations-Lexikon mit vorzüglicher Rücksicht auf die gegenwärtigen Zeiten (1796–1808; see Brockhaus)

Hebrew 
Ma'aseh Toviyyah (1707)

Italian encyclopedias
Vincenzo Coronelli Biblioteca Universale Sacro-Profana (1701–1707)
 Gianfrancesco Pivati Nuovo dizionario scientifico e curioso, sacroprofano (1746–1751)
Lorenzo Hervás y Panduro Idea dell'Universo (1778-1792)

Japanese encyclopedias
Wakan Sansai Zue (1712)

Polish encyclopedias
Nowe Ateny (1745)
Zbiór potrzebniejszych wiadomości (1781)

See also 
List of 19th-century encyclopedias
List of 20th-century general encyclopedias
List of English-language 20th-century general encyclopedias
History of the Encyclopædia Britannica

References 

 
18th